The women's 57 kg  competition in taekwondo at the 2000 Summer Olympics in Sydney took place on September 28 at the State Sports Centre.

South Korean fighter Jung Jae-eun yielded a 2–0 lead over her Vietnamese opponent Tran Hieu Ngan to capture her nation's first ever Olympic gold medal in the sport. Additionally, silver medalist Tran smade history to become Vietnam's first ever Olympic medalist. Meanwhile, 1995 World champion Hamide Bıkçın Tosun of Turkey, who lost to Jung in the semifinal and whose delegation complained about alleged biased judging, regrouped to beat Netherlands' Virginia Lourens 7–5 for the bronze.

Competition format
The main bracket consisted of a single elimination tournament, culminating in the gold medal match. The taekwondo fighters eliminated in earlier rounds by the two finalists of the main bracket advanced directly to the repechage tournament. These matches determined the bronze medal winner for the event.

Schedule
All times are Greece Standard Time (UTC+2)

Competitors

Results
Legend
PTG — Won by points gap
SUP — Won by superiority
OT — Won on over time (Golden Point)
WO — Walkover

Main bracket

Repechage

References

External links
Official Report

Women's 057 kg
Olymp
Women's events at the 2000 Summer Olympics